Chikhale may refer to:

 Chikhale, Panvel, a village in Raigad district of Maharashtra, India
 Chikhale, Dahanu, a village in Palghar district of Maharashtra, India